Dub techno is a subgenre of techno that combines the style with elements of dub music, including its sparse, delay-heavy production and prominent bass.

Characteristics and history
In the early 1990s, producers Moritz Von Oswald and Mark Ernestus formed Basic Channel, a duo credited for defining dub techno. In addition to making the presence of minimalism commonplace in the techno scene, they also incorporated delay effects that were recurrent in dub music.
They then formed the label Chain Reaction; while still releasing the same type of dub-infused techno that Basic Channel created, such as the track "Cyan I" by Monolake, the label also distributed techno without dub elements, such as Continuous Mode's "Direct Out / Direct Drive". Regardless, what Thump writer Josh Baines described as a "thawing of ice as a sonic aesthetic" that was present in Basic Channel's works before Chain Reaction still remained in all recordings issued under the label.

Another label, Rhythm & Sound, was started by Oswald and Ernestus, and focused strictly on dub reggae and dub techno unlike Chain Reaction. The works of Rhythm & Sound featured representations of the sound system culture of Jamaica, the country where dub was formed, as well as authentic elements of the roots of dub. According to Baines, this type of dub techno was "the kind of smoked out dub that's an approximate aural recreation of the effect that incredibly potent mairjuana [sic] has on the brain" and "a haunting, haunted, tripped out site of memorial exploration" where "Everything sounds half-remembered, half-there, half-real."

The "clicks and cuts movement" in the 1990s formed by Mille Plateaux, is labeled by Baines as also characterizing dub techno's sound; the label's releases focused on making the same type of dub techno that Basic Channel and their imprints recorded and issued, only much more melodic. The exposure of dub techno was then brought over to the United States by Rod Modell with his project Deepchord.

Analysis
Baines compared dub techno to ambient music, in that music of both genres acts as "background music" on purpose; it never tries to adventure into new and unique territory, because its only purpose is to be "placid, unquestioning" and "deeply soothing." He analyzed that the best tracks in the dub techno style do what little it does amazingly, in that "every element in the mix is given breathing space and, accordingly, takes on a sense of the organic."

References

Techno genres